There are 45 listed buildings (Swedish: byggnadsminne) in Halland County.

Falkenberg Municipality

Halmstad Municipality

Hylte Municipality

Kungsbacka Municipality

Laholm Municipality

Varberg Municipality

External links

  Bebyggelseregistret

Listed buildings in Sweden